WLAQ (1410 AM) is a radio station broadcasting a News Talk Information format. Licensed to Rome, Georgia, United States, the station was first licensed on May 4, 1947 and serves the Rome area.  The station is currently owned by Cripple Creek Broadcasting Company and features programming from CBS News Radio.

WLAQ currently provides a locally produced morning news/talk/sports program hosted by News Director Elizabeth Davis, as well as a great deal of local varsity sports coverage. WLAQ and its sister station WATG 95.7 FM The Ridge are flagship stations for coverage of the Rome Braves, Class A affiliate of the major league Atlanta Braves. Son of legendary Braves voice Skip Caray, Josh Caray, provided the play-by-play for the 2007 and 2008 seasons, now handled by Rome native Ben Poplin. Other sports coverage is provided by station principals Randy Davis, Matt Davis, and numerous other local sports watchers.

WLAQ's daily syndicated programming includes the Glenn Beck Program, Rush Limbaugh, Dave Ramsey, and continuous coverage through the night from ESPN Radio. The station also carries NASCAR coverage from the Motor Racing Network and Georgia Tech basketball and football.

Glenn Beck premiered on WLAQ in the 9 AM to noon time slot in September 2008, after decades of that time slot being filled by regionally syndicated talk-radio mainstay Ludlow Porch.

References

External links
TalkRadio 1410 WLAQ Rome, Georgia (706) 232-7767

LAQ
Radio stations established in 1947